Alan D. Albright (born November 24, 1959) is a United States district judge of the United States District Court for the Western District of Texas. He was formerly a United States magistrate judge of the same court. Albright oversees a significant portion of patent litigation within the United States. In 2021, the United States Court of Appeals for the Federal Circuit repeatedly rebuked him in a string of opinions for failing to transfer cases to more apt jurisdictions. A quarter of all patent lawsuits in the US were once heard by Albright, who has been widely criticized for ignoring binding case law. However, following a docket-stripping order issued by Chief Judge Orlando Garcia, Albright's patent docket has declined precipitously.

Biography 
Albright earned his Bachelor of Arts with honors from Trinity University and his Juris Doctor from the University of Texas School of Law. He taught trial advocacy at the University of Texas School of Law for several years as an adjunct. Before becoming a district judge, Albright was a partner in the Austin office of Bracewell LLP, where his practice focused on intellectual property law. He was in private practice at other firms in Austin from 1999 to 2015.

Federal judicial service 
Albright served as a United States magistrate judge of the United States District Court for the Western District of Texas from 1992 to 1999. On January 23, 2018, President Donald Trump announced his intent to nominate Albright to an undetermined seat on the United States District Court for the Western District of Texas. On January 24, 2018, his nomination was sent to the United States Senate. He was nominated to the seat vacated by Judge Walter Scott Smith Jr., who retired on September 14, 2016. On April 25, 2018, a hearing on his nomination was held before the Senate Judiciary Committee. On May 24, 2018, his nomination was reported out of committee by voice vote. On September 6, 2018, his nomination was confirmed by voice vote. He received his judicial commission on September 10, 2018, and was sworn in by Chief Judge Orlando Luis Garcia on September 18, 2018.

Criticisms 
After Albright encouraged patent owners to file claims in the Western District of Texas, one fifth of the nation's patent cases were filed in the district. On September 24, 2021, the United States Court of Appeals for the Federal Circuit rebuked Albright for refusing to follow the law limiting federal judges from retaining cases that should be transferred to another jurisdiction. On October 21, 2021, the Federal Circuit issued a writ of mandamus transferring another patent case that Judge Albright oversaw because of his prior denial of transfer. The Federal Circuit's opinion rebuked Albright's continuous denial of transfers from the Western District.

Due to Albright's actions, on November 2, 2021, Senators Thom Tillis and Patrick Leahy wrote a bipartisan letter asking Chief Justice John G. Roberts to direct the Judicial Conference of the United States to "conduct a study of actual and potential abuses" that result from an "absence of adequate rules regulating judicial assignment and venue for patent cases within a [single judicial] district.". The letter criticized Albright for having "openly solicited cases at lawyers' meetings" and for having "repeatedly ignored binding case law and abused his discretion," noting that Albright's decisions "resulted in a flood of mandamus petitions" being filed and granted "no fewer than 15 times in just the past two years.".

Judicial Reassignment Order for Patent Cases 
Because Albright is the only district judge in the Waco Division of the Western District of Texas, any patent cases filed in Waco were guaranteed to be assigned to him. This effectively gave plaintiffs the power to choose the judge to whom their cases were assigned by filing in the Waco Division, resulting in a disproportionately large number of patent cases being heard by Albright. Faced with mounting criticism from scholars, U.S. Senators, and the Chief Justice of the U.S. Supreme Court, on July 25, 2022, Chief Judge Orlando Garcia stripped Albright of automatic assignment of new patent cases filed in the Waco Division. The reassignment order states that to "equitably distribute" patent cases, any new patent cases filed in the Waco Division on or after July 25, 2022 would be randomly assigned among twelve of the judges of the Western District of Texas, reducing Albright's case load to approximately 8% of new patent cases filed in Waco. The order only impacts judicial assignment of cases filed in the Waco Division, and only affects patent cases. Chief Judge Garcia's order is widely viewed by practitioners as signaling the demise of the Western District of Texas as a major venue for patent litigation.

References

External links 
 

1959 births
Living people
20th-century American lawyers
20th-century American judges
21st-century American lawyers
21st-century American judges
Judges of the United States District Court for the Western District of Texas
People from Hershey, Pennsylvania
Texas lawyers
Trinity University (Texas) alumni
United States district court judges appointed by Donald Trump
United States magistrate judges
University of Texas School of Law alumni
University of Texas School of Law faculty